The Incheon Tidal Power Station is a large tidal power station proposed for  Incheon Bay, South Korea. The facility is designed to top  in generating capacity with the help of 44 water turbines rated at  each, which would make this facility the largest of its kind in the world. The construction and developments costs are expected to reach ₩3.9 trillion (US$3.4 billion), of which would be entirely covered by private funding. The station is expected to generate up to 2.41 TWh of energy annually.

Planning for the project was halted in 2012 following environmental concerns  since then there has been no news as to when it might proceed or be formally cancelled.

See also 

 List of largest power stations in the world
 List of power stations in South Korea
 List of tidal power stations

References 

Proposed tidal power stations
Tidal power stations in South Korea
Proposed renewable energy power stations in South Korea